Senna trolliiflora is a flowering plant species in the legume family (Fabaceae). It is a near-threatened species found only in Ecuador. Its natural habitat is subtropical or tropical moist lowland forests.

References

trolliiflora
Flora of Ecuador
Near threatened plants
Taxonomy articles created by Polbot